A golden number (sometimes capitalized) is a number assigned to each year in sequence which is used to indicate the dates of all the calendric new moons for each year in a 19-year Metonic cycle. They are used in computus (the calculation of the date of Easter) and also in Runic calendars. The golden number of any Julian or Gregorian calendar year can be calculated by dividing the year by 19, taking the remainder, and adding 1. (In mathematics this can be expressed as (year number modulo 19) + 1.)

For example,  divided by 19 gives , remainder .

Origin 
The golden number, as it was later called, first appears in a calendar composed by Abbo of Fleury around the year 1000. Around 1162 a certain Master William referred to this number as the golden number "because it is more precious than the other numbers." The name refers to the practice of printing golden numbers in gold. The term became widely known and used, in part through the computistic poem Massa Compoti written by Alexander de Villa Dei around 1200.

Modern-day use of the golden number

Following an initiative by Pope Francis in 2015, it has been proposed that the golden numbers, which are used by both eastern and western churches, form the basis of a common Easter date. Apart from its logistical convenience, it will bring to an end criticisms that in some areas Christ is still preaching while in others he is already crucified.

In 2022 an interdenominational discussion document prepared under the auspices of the International Commission for Anglican-Orthodox Theological Dialogue, (Metropolitan Athenagoras of Belgium, The Rt Revd Graham Usher, Bishop of Norwich, 22 pp), was lodged in the Cathedral Library at Norwich. Comments were invited (the Library is public, the document's title is The prospect of Whitby and its Call Number is 529.3).

Chapter 1 Early differences (page 1) notes:

A letter to the Church of Alexandria after the Council of Nicaea in 325 recorded:
We further proclaim to you the good news of the agreement concerning the Holy Easter, that this particular also has through your prayers rightly been settled: so that all our brethren in the East who formerly followed the custom of the Jews are henceforth to celebrate the said most sacred feast of Easter at the same time with the Romans and yourselves and all those who have observed Easter from the beginning.  

The penultimate sentence of the chapter (page 2) notes:

Constantine had admonished: 'Think, then, how unseemly it is, that on the same day some should be rejoicing at feasts, while others are still observing a strict fast.'

On the same page, Chapter 2 Summary of developments (which was added on the express instruction of the International Commission) notes:

664: Synod of Whitby. England aligns with Rome....

4 December 1563: The Council of Trent authorises the pope to revise the missal and breviary (but not the calendar)...

1564: Pius V reserves to himself the sole right of interpretation of the enactments...

24 February 1582: Gregory XIII claims the right to unilaterally change the calendar and the date of Easter and does so. Anyone who does not fall into line will be excommunicated.

Page 3 notes:

Queen Elizabeth's astronomical adviser...in 1582 advocated the 'astronomical Easter', an idea rejected by the pope...

At the end of the sixteenth century the Orthodox church issued a series of anathemas against the Gregorian calendar. It is easy to see why:

(1) the Julian calendar is simple to operate. Easter jumps forward in years 3, 6, 8, 11, 14, 17 and 19 of the nineteen-year cycle. This is the same rule which applies in the Jewish calendar, although the Jewish cycle begins three years later. Easter is thus kept in lockstep with Passsover. [Note: Although the interdenominational discussion document The prospect of Whitby may say this, in years with Christian golden number 8 (Jewish golden number 5) such as 2002 and 2021, Passover is more than a month earlier than the Eastern Easter. So "lockstep" should be not interpreted as meaning that they occur in the same lunar month.]

(2) the Julian calendar incorporates effective measures to prevent Easter being celebrated on [page 4] or before the Passover. These include:
 If the full moon falls on a Sunday Easter shall be the Sunday after
 The month preceding Easter always has thirty days
 The 'lockstep' safeguard referred to above
The Jewish calendar has a system of delays which prevent certain festivals being observed on certain days of the week. With only the first safeguard, the Gregorian Easter may fall a day or a month before the Passover. Eventually, Easter will fall a month before the Passover every year.

Method of calculating the date of Easter
Nineteen Julian years are slightly longer than 235 lunar months, while nineteen Gregorian or Revised Julian years are slightly shorter. Therefore, as time goes on, the eastern and western dates will coincide less and less, and in a few hundred years the western Easter will always precede the eastern one. The common ground is that, since the Synod of Whitby in AD 664, all churches agree that the "full moon" shall be observed on the fourteenth day of the lunar month. From this, the definition of Easter is derived:

EASTER-DAY, on which the rest depend, is always the First Sunday after the Eighteenth Day of Miri, and if the Eighteenth Day of Miri happens upon a Sunday, Easter-Day is the Sunday after. All of which holds until the year 2099 inclusive, after which, on account of adjustments made every three or four hundred years in the calendar used in the calculation (of which Miri is the third month) the reference to the "Eighteenth" day shall be replaced by a reference to the "Nineteenth" day, and so on.

The date of the full moon is identified in the table below. Both the old (current western) and new (current eastern) methods are given, as they have been in the Breviary since 1582. 

To use the table:

The date of Easter is found from numbers which are allotted to certain dates as indicated in the table. For any particular year, the number which is taken is the same as the remainder that is obtained when one is added to the year and the total divided by 19. If there is no remainder 19 is taken. If the number is in Group A, Easter falls on the Sunday following the date against which that number appears.   If the number is in Group B, Easter falls on the Sunday of the week commencing with the date against which that number appears.   

If the number is in Group C, the date against which it appears is to be treated as a day of March, and Easter falls on the day after the Saturday following that date.

Rules for updating the table

The boundary between Group A and Group B is usually set between 18 and 19 April, but if there are numbers against both 18 and 19 April (as in the 21st century) it's set between 17 and 18 April. The boundary between Group B and Group C is always set between 19 and 20 April.   The numbers are moved from time to time, and when they do move it's before Easter in years which are exactly divisible by 100. There are two separate movements:

1. The 'solar correction': the numbers move DOWN a day every time a centennial leap year is dropped (eg 2100)

2. The 'lunar correction': the numbers move UP a day in years giving remainder 200, 500, 800, 1100, 1400, 1800, 2100 and 2400 on division by 2500 (eg 2100).  

Sometimes the corrections cancel out - thus in 2100 the numbers stay where they are. For Orthodox Easter the instructions for Groups B and C are ignored. Easter is, from the last lunar correction in 1800 to the year before the next lunar correction in 2100, the Sunday after the Wednesday following the date given by the table current for the relevant century. From 2100 until the year before the following lunar correction (in 2400) replace 'Wednesday' by 'Tuesday', and so on.

Example calculation

On what date does Orthodox Easter fall in 2023?

2023 + 1 = 2024
2024/19 = 106 remainder 10
Sunday Letter for 2023 is A
10 stands against 5 April
The nearest 'A' day is 2 April.
Therefore, 2 April is Sunday and 5 April is Wednesday
The following Wednesday is 12 April
The following Sunday is 16 April
Orthodox Easter is 16 April.

What the prospects are for this method being implemented 
Page 5 of the document notes:

In the middle east even the Latin rite Catholics and Protestant churches have been observing Orthodox Easter since 1975, and in January 2016 Bishop Mouneer Anis (as he then was) reaffirmed this for Anglicans in Arabia (including the Gulf States), Cyprus, Egypt with North Africa and the Horn of Africa, Iraq, Israel (including occupied territories), Jordan, Lebanon, Persia and Syria.

Page 6 notes:

In 1900 the Macedonian-born academic Maksim Trpkovic published at Belgrade his Reforma Kalendara (Calendar Reform).   Based on Barnaba Oriani's proposed reform which became the state calendar of Greece [references cited] it featured epact calculations for the twentieth century and new paschal limits in the 19-year cycle of golden numbers, after which the dates of the new moons repeat.

In 1903 the Holy Synod of the Greek Orthodox Church wrote to the Oecumanical Patriarch stating that the Julian calendar would be preserved.

Page 8 notes:

The Congress deliberated in May and June 1923. Advocating his solution astronomer Milutin Milankovic said that with the proposition of the Serbian delegation (which had previously advocated the newly-introduced state calendar of Greece) the Orthodox Church would have the most precise and most scientific calendar in the Christian world, so it could [page 9] confidently enter any negotiations on the calendar question with Western Churches.   An astronomical Easter was adopted, calculated for the meridian of the Church of the Holy Sepulchre in Jerusalem.

There follows Chapter 6 Changes in church law are reversed following rejection by the people.   It includes the following on page 9:

Alexandrian patriarch Photius had told the Oecumenical Patriarch on 15 January 1924 (old style) that '...we reject every addition or any change of the calendar before the convocation of an Ecumenical Council, which alone is capable of discussing this question, concerning which Ecumenical Council we propose a speedy convocation .'

Chapter 7 A light at the end of the tunnel (page 11) notes:

A proposal was made in 1997 to impose something very similar to the 1923 agreement on all churches...Under it, Easter would break its canonical limits, leaving the way open for Shrove Tuesday to clash with Candlemas [reference cited]. At the end of the explanation the dates of the astronomical, Gregorian and Julian Easters are tabulated for the years 2001-2025 along with the Vernal full moon astron. reckoning and the date of Passover [reference cited]. In eight of those 25 years the full moon at Greenwich fell on the day before the Passover...

On 12 June 2015, at the World Retreat of Priests at the Basilica of St John Lateran in Rome, Pope Francis observed that 'we have to come to an agreement' for a common date on Easter. Lucetta Scaraffia, writing in the Vatican newspaper L'Osservatore Romano, explained that the Pope is offering this initiative to change the date of Easter 'as a gift of unity with the other Christian churches.' 

Introducing the discussion document on 3 November 2020 and commending the proposals the International Commission stated that it:

...blends the political realities of ecclesiastical and state politics, particularly in the Christian East, with the mathematical reasons why varying astronomical calculations cause such confusion on the dates for religious festivals...the celebration of Easter on different days and...the loss of the link with Passover is to be lamented..."

The Commission points out that it is the very opposite of a proposal for "Reform of the date of Easter." The proposal by the Pope was floated in 2015. Justin Welby told the British government to get ready to implement an agreement in January 2016 and the Catholic Herald wrote:

When the Archbishop of Canterbury rationalises such a momentous decision by pointing to difficulties over school holidays one has to ask: what is the biggest influence here? Christian unity or relatively frivolous secular concerns? If the latter is a motivation then such a move - to borrow the Holy Father's words - could also prove to be a scandal."

This website claims that they are trying to reach a final agreement by 2025. Yet the discussions reported in Zenit are presented as completely new. Although they say astronomers will be consulted there is no explanation of why, after eight years, this has yet to happen. The controversial claim that the date of Easter is not a religious matter but a scientific one is presented as fact. The fact that reform of the date of Easter is not on the agenda of the Orthodox Church, and many Orthodox churches have severed relations with the Oecumenical Patriarch on this account, is nowhere mentioned.

See also
Dominical letter
Date of Easter
Paschal Full Moon

References

External links

Time in astronomy
Calendars